Space Probe was a Giant Drop ride located at Wonderland Sydney in Australia. It was manufactured by Intamin and opened as the world's tallest and fastest free-fall ride. The ride opened in November 1995 and closed on 26 April 2004.

Ride experience
Once passengers arrive at the front of the queue, they pass through a turnstile and enter a debriefing room via a sliding-door airlock. Once they are debriefed they leave through a second door and enter the launch bay area, guests then take their seat in their given vehicle.

Traveling at a speed of 20 kilometres per hour (12 mph), riders reach the top of the tower in 25 seconds. The vehicles slowly enter a large umbrella as they climb the last few feet. Within, twelve TV units laid out as 4 per vehicle, each display a 10 second countdown.

Once the countdown is finished, the coupler detaches, letting riders free-fall  in 3.8 seconds. Each vehicle is stopped by a fail-safe magnetic braking system and arrives back into the station.

Facts
The ride was originally known as Space Probe 7. The Seven Network were involved in the lead up to the ride's opening, donating the network's logo and credibility. They were contracted as major sponsors, helping with advertising, promotion and the ride's title. After this contract expired the '7' was removed from the title and was thereafter known as Space Probe.

Space Probe was the second Giant Drop ride manufactured and installed by Intamin. The first opened in October 1995 as Hellevator at Kentucky Kingdom in Louisville, Kentucky, USA. The Intamin Giant Drop was the world's tallest free-fall ride for approximately 4 months and the fastest until December, 1998.

In December 1998, it was surpassed in speed by the Giant Drop at Dreamworld. The ride and queues were intensively themed around an alien invasion, in order to fit in with the horror themed area of the park (Transylvania).

The queue area was heavily themed to look like an escape hatch from a futuristic space-station. It featured a long and dark, snake-like tunnel, with TV units and lighting effects placed periodically throughout the queue. The entire conscious of the ride was based on an alien life-form infecting our planet and thus leading to evacuation. The ride starts at the entrance of the tunnel, where in queue TVs informed guests of the current situation. The TVs constantly played a roughly 30-60 minute news broadcast about an alien invasion. As the guests progressed throughout the tunnel they would be informed of the current situation, divided by which part of the tunnel they were occupying. As the guests moved closer to the front of the queue they would then be told to evacuate. The broadcast was filmed and designed to look like a modern version of a Seven Network news report.

Once the vehicle reached the top of the tower, it would then be dropped at random - a few seconds before the countdown reached zero, or held until after the countdown had finished. The first on-ride photos were taken using cameras placed at the top of the tower, inside the umbrella. The photos were taken as the vehicle was detached from the coupler. A few years later, new on-ride photo cameras were installed on the roof above the launch bay area, taken as the vehicle came to a stop.

The ride opened in 1995, three years after the opening of The Demon. It was the second and only new ride installed in the park. The official cost to build the tower was published at AUD$10 million.

References

External links
 Space Probe at Wonderland History
 Space Probe Videos at Wonderland History
 Australia's Wonderland Sydney - Space Probe HD at YouTube
 Australia's Wonderland Sydney - Space Probe at YouTube
 Space Probe (Wonderland Sydney) at Parkz

Amusement rides introduced in 1995
Amusement rides that closed in 2004
Amusement rides manufactured by Intamin
Drop tower rides
Towers completed in 1995
Wonderland Sydney